Mary Tracy Earle (October 21, 1864 – September 7, 1955) was an American fiction author. She contributed short stories and occasional essays to various periodicals. Among her published works can be counted The Wonderful Wheel (1896), The Man Who Worked for Collister (1898), Through Old Rose Glasses (1900), and The Flag on the Hilltop (1902).

Early life and education

Mary Tracy Earle was born in Cobden, Illinois, October 21, 1864. Her parents were Parker and Melanie (Tracy) Earle. Parker was the horticultural director at the World Cotton Centennial in New Orleans, 1884. Melanie's mother, Hannah Tracy Cutler was an abolitionist as well as a leader of the temperance and women's suffrage movements in the United States. Mary had two brothers: Charles Theodore Earle, and the mycologist, Franklin Sumner Earle.

Earle attended Cobden High School. She represented Alethenai Literary Society in the intersociety oratorical contest of 1884, while attending the University of Illinois. She graduated from the University of Illinois in 1885 (B.S.) and received an A.M. degree in 1903.

Career
Beginning in 1885, Earle lived in the south, where she began to write, at first not with any purpose, but simply in accordance to the inspiration. As she grew older, her predilection for literary pursuits became more pronounced, and in 1898, when she removed to New York City, it was with the intention of devoting herself seriously to a writing career. She continued writing through 1904. From 1904 to 1907, she served as a Librarian and Editorial Assistant, Estación Central Agronómica de Cuba. In 1907, she returned to writing.

On July 1, 1906, in Santiago de las Vegas, Cuba, she married William Titus Horne (1876-1944), Professor of Plant Pathology in the University of California, Berkeley.

From 1887, Earle contributed short stories and occasional essays in The Outlook, The Atlantic Monthly, The Century, Everybody's, Harper's Weekly, McClure's, Scribner's, as well as other magazines and papers. She was also the author of: The Wonderful Wheel (Century Company, 1896); The Man Who Worked for Collister (Copeland & Day, Boston, 1898); Through Old Rose Glasses (Houghton, Mifflin & Co., Boston, 1900); and The Flag on the Hilltop (Houghton, Mifflin & Co., Boston, 1902). Most of her stories were of the South, where she had spent much of her time, but some are of Southern Illinois.

Personal life
In 1907, Earle was living in Santiago de las Vegas, Cuba. In 1913, she was living in Berkeley, California. She died in Riverside, California, September 7, 1955.

Selected works
 The Wonderful Wheel, 1896
 The Man Who Worked for Collister, 1898
 Through Old Rose Glasses, 1900
 The Flag on the Hilltop, 1902

References

Attribution

Bibliography

External links

 

1864 births
1955 deaths
19th-century American novelists
19th-century American short story writers
19th-century American women writers
20th-century American novelists
20th-century American short story writers
20th-century American women writers
People from Union County, Illinois
Writers from Illinois
University of Illinois alumni
American women novelists